Dimapur III is one of the 60 Legislative Assembly constituencies of Nagaland state in India. Previously part of Dimapur District, it is now a part of Chümoukedima District and is reserved for candidates belonging to the Scheduled Tribes. It is also part of Nagaland Lok Sabha constituency.

Members of Legislative Assembly
 1974: Debalai Mech, Naga Nationalist Organisation
 1977: Debalal Mech, Indian National Congress
 1982: Lolit Mech, Indian National Congress
 1987: Vehepu Yepthomi, Independent
 1989: Kihoto Hollohon, Nagaland People's Council
 1993: Kihoto Hollohon, Indian National Congress
 1998: Atovi Sumi, Indian National Congress
 2003: Kihoto Hollohon, Nationalist Democratic Movement

Election results

2023

2018

2013

2008

See also
List of constituencies of the Nagaland Legislative Assembly
Dimapur district
 Dimapur
 Nagaland (Lok Sabha constituency)

References

Dimapur
Assembly constituencies of Nagaland